Dr. Grip is a brand of mechanical pencil made by Pilot Pens based in Japan. The Dr. Grip style also comes in a pen variety. It is well known for its "deflection-deflection/knock system." For its ergonomic features, the Dr. Grip pencil has been awarded the Arthritis Foundation's "Commendation for Ease-of-Use."

Features
The deflection-deflection system is a special form of lead advancement.  A pencil using this system is also commonly known as a "shaker pencil".  A small, metal weight lies around the core of the pencil, and when shaken, slides up and down; thus pushing the lead advancer down and advancing more lead.

For ergonomics, the Dr. Grip pencil was designed with a wide barrel and cushioned grip to relieve writing stress and fatigue.

Models
The majority of Dr. Grip pencil models only differ in color. The "Center of Gravity" pencil is a slightly different model in that it's designed with a different weight distribution for more comfortable, balanced writing. It's also has a wide double layer comfort grip to reduce writing stress. In the United States this pencil comes in a model using 0.7mm lead only.  There is no knock system for the US model. In Japan the G-Spec Dr. Grip is available, which is the same pencil, but using 0.5mm lead with a knock system.

The pencils are available in 0.5mm and 0.7mm depending on the style of pencil.

List of Dr. Grip styles
Dr. Grip
LTD (US only) 0.5mm
GEL
Neon
G-Spec (Japan only) 0.5mm
Center of Gravity (US version of G-Spec, without knock system) 0.7mm
OffRoader 0.5mm
G-Spec white (Japan only) 0.5mm
4+1 (Japan only)
Putimo [mini] (Japan only) 0.5mm
Putimo Color [mini] (Japan only)
Mini
Sky-time 0.5mm
Aroma (Japan only) 0.5mm
Barazoku (Japan only)
PlayBorder (Japan only) 0.5mm
Frost Color Series (Japan only) 0.5mm
FullBlack (Japan only) 0.5mm
PureWhite (Japan only) 0.5mm

Pencil brands